= MT-RNR2-like 4 =

Protein-coding gene in the species Homo sapiens

MTRNR2L4

Identifiers
- Aliases: MTRNR2L4, HN4, MT-RNR2-like 4, MT-RNR2 like 4, MT-RNR2 like 4 (pseudogene)
- External IDs: GeneCards: MTRNR2L4; OMA:MTRNR2L4 - orthologs

Gene location (Human)
| Chr. | Chromosome 16 (human) |
| Band | 16p13.3 | Start | 3,370,979 bp |
| Band | 16p13.3 | End | 3,372,668 bp |
RNA expression pattern
| Bgee | Human / Mouse (ortholog); Top expressed in: stomach; heart; brain; colon; liver; testicle; muscle tissue; lung; kidney / n/a; More reference expression data |
| BioGPS | n/a |
Gene ontology
| Molecular function | receptor antagonist activity |
| Cellular component | extracellular region; cytoplasm |
| Biological process | extracellular negative regulation of signal transduction; negative regulation of execution phase of apoptosis; negative regulation of signaling receptor activity |
Sources:Amigo / QuickGO
Orthologs
| Species | Human | Mouse |
| Entrez | 100463285 | n/a |
| Ensembl | ENSG00000232196 | n/a |
| UniProt | P0CJ71 | n/a |
| RefSeq (mRNA) | NM_001190476 | n/a |
| RefSeq (protein) | NP_001177405 | n/a |
| Location (UCSC) | Chr 16: 3.37 – 3.37 Mb | n/a |
| PubMed search | | n/a |
- Wikidata
| View/Edit Human |

MT-RNR2-like 4 is a protein that in humans is encoded by the MTRNR2L4 gene.
